Trey McBride (born November 22, 1999) is an American football tight end for the Arizona Cardinals of the National Football League (NFL). He played college football at Colorado State, where he was named a unanimous All-American and the John Mackey Award winner in 2021. McBride was drafted by the Cardinals in the second round of the 2022 NFL Draft.

Early life
McBride grew up in Fort Morgan, Colorado and attended Fort Morgan High School, where he played baseball, basketball, and football. As a junior, he had 32 catches for 751 yards and 11 touchdowns and was named Class 3A All-Colorado. He repeated as an All-Colorado selection as a senior after rushing for 226 yards, catching 30 passes for 450 yards, and scoring four total touchdowns while also recording 40 tackles and one sack on defense. McBride holds the school's career records for points scored in basketball, as well as for career home runs and RBIs in baseball.

College career
Considered a three-star recruit by 247Sports coming out of high school, McBride accepted a scholarship offer from Colorado State over offers from Colorado, Cal, Kansas State, Navy, Northern Colorado, and Wyoming.

As a freshman, McBride played in all 12 of Colorado State's games, starting five games. He caught seven passes for 89 yards and one touchdown. McBride was also an Academic All-Mountain West and was named first-team Academic All-Colorado by the Colorado Chapter of the National Football Foundation.

As a sophomore, McBride was named first team All-Mountain West Conference in his sophomore season after finishing his first full season as a starter with 45 receptions for 560 yards and four touchdowns. McBride recorded his first 100-yard receiving game on November 29, 2019, where he had 9 catches for 101 yards against Boise State.

Prior to his junior season and amidst the COVID-19 pandemic, McBride briefly entered the transfer portal before deciding to stay with the team. He was one of two team captains and started all four games of the team's COVID-19-shortened 2020 season. He was named second team All-Mountain West after catching 22 passes for 330 yards and four touchdowns in four games and was also named an All-American honorable mention by Pro Football Focus. McBride led the team in both receiving yardage and scoring and became the first CSU tight end to ever lead the team in points scored in a season.

In anticipation of his senior season, McBride was named to a number of award watch lists, including the Biletnikoff Award, Mackey Award, Lombardi Award, and the Senior Bowl watch list.
On September 4, 2021, the first game of McBride's senior season, he recorded 13 catches for 116 yards against South Dakota State and was named to the National Team of the Week by Pro Football Focus. In a week three 22-6 victory over Toledo, he caught nine passes for 109 receiving yards on a team-total 110 passing yards and was named the Offensive Player of the Week by the Senior Bowl. On October 16, 2021, McBride recorded a college career-high 135 receiving yards on 7 receptions against New Mexico. On November 6, 2021, in a Border War loss to Wyoming, he had nine receptions for 98 yards and broke the CSU school record for career receiving yards by a tight end.

McBride recorded at least 100 receiving yards in six of his 12 games played in 2021, and recorded less than 50 receiving yards only once. He was named to the 2021 All-Mountain West Conference first team, as well as being recognized as the nation's best tight end in college football by receiving the 2021 Mackey Award on December 9, 2021. McBride was also named to all five major All-American teams (AFCA, AP, FWAA, SN, WCFF) in 2021, making him the fifth consensus All-American and first unanimous All-American in Colorado State football history.

McBride holds multiple school records at Colorado State, including the records for most receptions and receiving yards by tight end in a single season (90 receptions for 1,121 yards in 2021), as well as the records for receptions and receiving yards in a career by a tight end (157 receptions for 2,011 yards from 2018 to 2021).

Professional career

McBride was selected by the Arizona Cardinals in the second round (55th overall) of the 2022 NFL Draft.

Personal life
McBride was raised by two mothers, making him the first NFL player to have been raised from a same-sex marriage. He has two older brothers, a twin brother, and a younger sister. One of Trey's older brothers, Toby, played football at Colorado State as a defensive end.

References

External links
 Arizona Cardinals bio
Colorado State Rams bio

1999 births
Living people
People from Fort Morgan, Colorado
Players of American football from Colorado
American football tight ends
All-American college football players
Colorado State Rams football players
Arizona Cardinals players